Erik Osbaldo Espinosa Delgadillo (born 13 January 1980) is a Mexican former footballer who played as a midfielder.

Espinosa has been capped once while on the Mexico national team – it was at the 2002 CONCACAF Gold Cup, where he played in a 1–0 win over El Salvador.

External links 
 
 
 

1980 births
Living people
Footballers from Guadalajara, Jalisco
Association football midfielders
Mexican footballers
Mexico international footballers
2002 CONCACAF Gold Cup players
Atlético Mexiquense footballers
Deportivo Toluca F.C. players
C.D. Veracruz footballers
Correcaminos UAT footballers
Alacranes de Durango footballers